Delta Electronics, Inc. (also known as DELTA or Delta Electronics), is a Taiwanese electronics manufacturing company. Its headquarters are in Neihu, Taipei. It is known for its DC industrial and computer fans and for switching power supplies. The company operates approximately 200 facilities worldwide, including manufacturing, sales, and R&D centers.

Overview
Delta is a major supplier of power components to Apple and Tesla.

Delta is a member of the Taiwan Climate Partnership. The company is committed to reaching net-zero carbon emissions.

History

Delta Electronics was founded in 1971 in Xinzhuang Town, Taipei County (now Xinzhuang District, New Taipei City). Its first products were TV deflection coils, electronic components and winding magnetic components. It is also a supplier of cooling components. On August 20, 1975, Delta Electronics was reorganized into a company limited by shares.

As a result of the US-China trade war, Delta cut its headcount in China by more than half and expanded operations in India and Southeast Asia.

In 2020, Delta had NT$282.6bn (US$10bn) in sales.

In December 2021, the company announced the acquisition of United States-based Universal Instruments Corporation for approximately 89 million dollars. The more than 100-year-old Universal Instruments will continue to operate independently and without a change in management. Universal holds more than 500 automation related patents.

In July 2022, Delta announced they would be expanding their Plano facility with the addition of 400,000-square-foot manufacturing, research, and development hub that could require "hundreds" of new employees.

Subsidiaries 
 Delta Electronics (Thailand) Public Company Limited was founded in 1988. The company is a subsidiary of Delta Electronics, Inc. Delta Thailand has become the regional business head office and manufacturing center in India and Southeast Asia. The company has been mainly produced power management and the manufacturing electronic components, i.e. cooling fan, electromagnetic interference filter (EMI) and solenoid. Delta's current power management products include power systems for information technology, automotive, telecommunications, industrial applications, office automation, medical industries, EV chargers, DC-DC converters and adapters. In March 2023 Delta Electronics (Thailand) surpassed Airports of Thailand to become the most valuable publicly traded company in Thailand.
 Delta International Holding Limited B.V.
 DELBio
 Eltek

Competitors 
 Lite-On
 Artesyn
 Bel Power
 Compuware Technology

See also

 List of companies of Taiwan

References

1971 establishments in Taiwan
Companies listed on the Taiwan Stock Exchange
Taiwanese brands
Electronics companies of Taiwan
Electronics companies established in 1971
Power supply manufacturers
Computer power supply unit manufacturers